Steven Brian Shirley (born October 12, 1956) is a retired pitcher in Major League Baseball. He pitched in 11 games for the Los Angeles Dodgers during the 1982 baseball season. He also pitched two seasons in Japan, 1983 and 1984, for the Lotte Orions. He was manager of the Sioux Falls Canaries from 2006 to 2014, winning the league championship in 2008. He then was hired as manager of the Sussex County Miners.

References

External links
, or Retrosheet or  Pura Pelota (Venezuelan Winter League)

1956 births
Living people
Albuquerque Dukes players
American Association of Professional Baseball managers
American expatriate baseball players in Japan
Bakersfield Dodgers players
Baseball players from San Francisco
Bellingham Dodgers players
Cardenales de Lara players
Hawaii Islanders players
Indianapolis Indians players
Lodi Dodgers players
Los Angeles Dodgers players
Lotte Orions players
Major League Baseball pitchers
Minor league baseball managers
Nashville Sounds players
Navegantes del Magallanes players
American expatriate baseball players in Venezuela
Omaha Royals players
San Antonio Dodgers players
Sioux Falls Canaries managers
Waterbury Dodgers players